Cuzamá is a town in the state of Yucatán, Mexico, capital of the homonymous municipality, located about 50 kilometers southeast of the city of Mérida, the state capital and 15 km southeast of the town of Acanceh.

Populated places in Yucatán